Lipkin is a surname. Notable people with the surname include:

 Amnon Lipkin-Shahak (1944–2012), Israeli military officer
 Dmitry Lipkin, television writer and playwright
 Harry J. Lipkin (1921–2015), Israeli theoretical physicist
 Heather Slade-Lipkin, English pianist, harpsichordist and teacher
 Malcolm Lipkin (1932–2017), English composer
 Miles Jackson-Lipkin (1924–2012), jurist
 Nikolay Lipkin (born 1985), canoeist
 Pamela Lipkin (born 1952), plastic surgeon
 Semyon Lipkin (1911–2003), writer and poet
 Seymour Lipkin (1927–2015), pianist, conductor and teacher
 Simon Lipkin, British thespian
 Steven Barry Lipkin (born 1942), American songwriter and record producer
 W. Ian Lipkin (born 1952), the John Snow Professor of Epidemiology at the Mailman School of Public Health
 Yisrael Lipkin Salanter (1809–1883), Lithuanian Rabbi
 Yom Tov Lipman Lipkin (1846–1876), Lithuanian Jewish mathematician, inventor of Peaucellier–Lipkin linkage and son of Yisrael Lipkin Salanter
 Callie Lipkin (1976–), American commercial photographer

See also 
 Lipkin Gorman v Karpnale Ltd
 Peaucellier–Lipkin linkage
 Lipki (disambiguation)

Jewish surnames
Russian-language surnames